The Royal Prince Edward Yacht Club is a yacht club located on Wolsley Road, Point Piper, New South Wales, in Australia. The club was founded in 1922 and permission obtained from Prince Edward to use his name.

The waterside site on Lady Martin's Beach in Felix Bay was purchased in the same year on which a purpose-built clubhouse and bowling green were constructed.
Its first race was held on Saturday 18 November 1922. In 1935 it was granted permission to use the prefix "Royal" although newspaper reports from its inception used this title.

References

External links 

 

Yacht clubs in New South Wales
1922 establishments in Australia
Organisations based in Australia with royal patronage
Sports clubs established in 1922